UTS North Sydney Cricket Club, formerly known as North Sydney District Cricket Club, is a cricket club based in North Sydney, Australia. The Bears, as they are known, were founded in 1858 playing against Callen Park and other cricket clubs around Sydney at that time. UTS North Sydney currently plays in the NSW Premier Cricket. Having joined in 1893 as one of its founding members, the club is one of oldest elite cricket clubs in Sydney.

The club's home ground is the famous North Sydney Oval where it has remained since its inception. In the 1980s, North Sydney Council purchased some old grandstands from the Sydney Cricket Ground during its re-development, and relocated them to North Sydney Oval. In the 1980s, the club and community recognised the potential of the Miller St location and worked with the then North Sydney Mayor and current club Patron Ted Mack to develop the ground, enhancing its historic character.

The Bears have won 5 first grade premierships, 11 second grade cups, 9 third grade titles, 2 fifth grade titles and 1 Poidevin Gray (U21s) and AW Green Shield (U16s) titles. In the 1980s and 1990s, a powerful North Sydney side captured four limited-overs titles from six. That strength in the short form of the game continued in 2012/13 with the club claiming its fifth one day premiership.

Notable players 
In the club's history, there have been several notable players. These include:

See also

 History of Australian cricket
 University of Technology Sydney

References

External links
UTS North Sydney Cricket Club

Cricket clubs established in 1858
Sydney Grade Cricket clubs
1858 establishments in Australia
Sporting clubs in Sydney
North Sydney, New South Wales
University and college sports clubs in Australia
University of Technology Sydney